Cinq is French for 'five', and may refer to:
 CINQ-FM, a multilingual Canadian radio station located in Montreal, Quebec
 Cinq Music Group, an American music distribution, record label, and rights management company
 La Cinq, a French free-to-air television network
 Le Cinq, a gourmet restaurant in Paris, France
 Cinq (playing card), obscure name for a playing card having the number five

See also
 Cinco (disambiguation)
 Cink, an abandoned settlement in southern Slovenia
 Cinque (disambiguation)
 Numéro Cinq, a former online international journal of arts and letters
 Park Cinq, a luxury cooperative apartment building in Manhattan, New York